is a Japanese manga series written and illustrated by . It was serialized in the  manga magazine Weekly Morning from 2005 to 2017 and collected into 25  volumes by publisher Kodansha. Hyouge Mono won an Excellence Prize for manga at the 13th Japan Media Arts Festival in 2009. It also won the Grand Prize at the 14th Tezuka Osamu Cultural Prizes in 2010. The manga was adapted into an anime television series in 2011.

Plot 
During the Sengoku period in Japan, while the shadow of Oda Nobunaga still looms over the land, the warlord Furuta Sasuke loses his soul to the tea ceremony. While war shakes the world around him, he faces his own conflict between his desire for promotion and his love for his art.

Characters 

A vassal of Oda Nobunaga. He is an aesthete, a person who holds a dear appreciation of art and beauty. He is obsessed with the form of glazed pottery, tea, and architecture. He is married to Osen (voiced by Megumi Toyoguchi).

An ambitious man who seeks control over not only Japan, but also the Ming (Chinese) and Joseon (Korean) dynasties. Sasuke is one of his vassals.

The most influential tea master. He greedily pursues a life centered around the  worldview. Sasuke is one of his pupils.

A sharp vassal of Oda Nobunaga who becomes a powerful person after Nobunaga's death. He likes women and has no sense of aesthetics.

An idealistic vassal of Oda Nobunaga, he feels antipathy to his lord's policy.

A loyal vassal from Mikawa. He has a strong sense of justice, and succeeds Oda in his work to reunify Japan.

A younger brother of Nobunaga. He is a smart playboy and smooth fellow.

A loyal vassal of Toyotomi Hideyoshi. He is a meticulous person and has little interest in art.

Other characters include Nobunaga's African retainer Yasuke (voiced by Takaya Kuroda), tea connoisseur Hechikan, Hideyoshi's wife Kita no Mandokoro and his concubine Lady Chacha, his mother Ōmandokoro, and the painter Hasegawa Tōhaku.

Media

Manga 
Hyouge Mono premiered in Kodansha's Weekly Morning magazine in 2005. It ended its serialization in the magazine's 2017 53rd issue on November 30, 2017. Kodansha collected the individual chapters into 25  volumes published from December 21, 2005, to January 23, 2018.

Anime 
The manga was adapted into an anime television series directed by Kōichi Mashimo and animated by Bee Train. It aired for 39 episodes on the NHK's Broadcast Satellite (BS) channels from April 7, 2011, to January 26, 2012.

The first opening theme of the anime is "Bowl Man" by Cro-Magnon featuring Yoshi Ikuzō, and the ending theme is "KIZUNA" by Yuki Saito. In April 2011, Cro-Magnon band member Tsuyoshi Kosuga was arrested on suspicion of violating Japan's Cannabis Control Law. As a result, the NHK changed the opening theme to "Naghol Jumping" by Quasimode for episodes five through ten. Starting with episode 11, the opening was changed to "Ebi Sukui" by Taku Takahashi of m-flo.

In June 2011, for unstated reasons, series creator Yoshihiro Yamada and the editors of Weekly Morning quit consulting for the anime series, and Yamada had his credit changed from the author of the "original story" to the author of the "original concept".

Episode list

Reception 
Hyouge Mono won an Excellence Prize for manga at the 13th Japan Media Arts Festival in 2009. It also won the Grand Prize at the 14th Tezuka Osamu Cultural Prizes in 2010.

Notes

References

External links 
 Official blog 
 Official manga website at Weekly Morning 
 Official anime website at the NHK 
 
 

2005 manga
2011 anime television series debuts
2012 Japanese television series endings
Bee Train Production
Historical anime and manga
Kodansha manga
NHK original programming
Seinen manga
Winner of Tezuka Osamu Cultural Prize (Grand Prize)